Nathan Krinsky, also known as Nat Krinsky, (8 January 1899 – 8 May 1984) was born to Russian immigrants and was a professional basketball player.  Krinsky is included in several pictures of the Basketball Hall of Fame, and is in the Basketball Old Timers Hall of Fame. Krinsky was  Jewish and was mentioned in Bob Wechsler's book Day by Day in Jewish Sports History. 

After graduating from an all-boys high school in 1917, Krinsky attended the City College of New York.

Krinsky was also the father of Paul L. Krinsky, former superintendent of the United States Merchant Marine Academy, and Edward M. Krinsky, former Director of Operations for the United States Basketball League.

References

1899 births
1983 deaths